Paddock Township may refer to one of the following places in the United States:

 Paddock Township, Otter Tail County, Minnesota
 Paddock Township, Gage County, Nebraska
 Paddock Township, Holt County, Nebraska

Township name disambiguation pages